In music, Op. 80 stands for Opus number 80. Compositions that are assigned this number include:

 Beethoven – Choral Fantasy (Beethoven)
 Brahms – Academic Festival Overture
 Dvořák – String Quartet No. 8
 Elgar – The Spirit of England
 Fauré – Pelléas et Mélisande
 Mendelssohn – String Quartet No. 6
 Prokofiev – Violin Sonata No. 1
 Reger – Zwölf Stücke, Op. 80
 Schumann – Piano Trio No. 2
 Strauss – Die schweigsame Frau